All Hell is the sixth and final studio album by American post-hardcore band Vanna. The album was released on July 8, 2016.

Track listing

Personnel
Vanna
Davey Muise – lead vocals 
Nicholas Lambert – guitar
Joel Pastuszak – guitar, vocals
Shawn Marquis – bass
Seamus Menihane – drums

Production
Produced, mixed and mastered by Will Putney, at Graphic Nature Studios, Belleville, NJ
Engineered by Randy LeBeouf
Mix assistant/additional engineering  by Steve Seid
Additional tracking and engineering by Kevin Billingslea at The Halo Studio
Art concept and direction by Liz Bergesch and Davey Muise
Layout Design by Adam Toomey and Liz Bergesch
Branding and illustration by Adam Toomey

Charts

References

2016 albums
Vanna (band) albums
Pure Noise Records albums
Albums produced by Will Putney